Francisco 'Fran' Javier Machado Ramos (born 29 March 1984) is a Spanish footballer who plays as an attacking midfielder for Arenas CD.

Club career
Born in Armilla, Granada, Machado played youth football for Elche CF, making his senior debut with the reserves in the Tercera División. On 2 November 2003 he played his first competitive game with the first team, coming on as a late substitute in a 2–2 Segunda División home draw against Ciudad de Murcia. He was almost exclusively associated to the B's during his spell, however.

In the following eight years, Machado competed in the Segunda División B, with Villajoyosa CF, CD Alcoyano, Betis Deportivo Balompié and Real Jaén. He achieved promotion at the end of the 2012–13 season with Jaén, scoring three goals in 36 matches while acting as their captain.

Machado then represented, still in the third tier, Cádiz CF, Recreativo de Huelva and Ontinyent CF. On 28 March 2019, after the dissolution of the latter club, the 35-year-old left.

On 12 July 2019, Machado returned to Alcoyano. In January 2021, he signed for Arenas CD in the Andalusian regional leagues.

References

External links

1984 births
Living people
Spanish footballers
Footballers from Andalusia
Association football midfielders
Segunda División players
Segunda División B players
Tercera División players
Tercera Federación players
Divisiones Regionales de Fútbol players
Elche CF Ilicitano footballers
Elche CF players
Villajoyosa CF footballers
CD Alcoyano footballers
Betis Deportivo Balompié footballers
Real Jaén footballers
Cádiz CF players
Recreativo de Huelva players
Ontinyent CF players